LÉ Gráinne (CM10) was a  in the Irish Naval Service. She was the former . She was named after Gráinne, a legendary princess who was promised to Fionn Mac Cumhail but ran away with his young follower Diarmuid.

Oulston was purchased from the Royal Navy in 1971, and commissioned as Gráinne. She was stricken in 1987 and sold to Spanish interests for breaking.

References 

1953 ships
Former naval ships of the Republic of Ireland
Ton-class minesweepers of the Irish Naval Service
Ton-class minesweepers of the Royal Navy
Cold War minesweepers of the United Kingdom
Ships built in Southampton
Ships built by John I. Thornycroft & Company